Ahn Chil-hyun (born October 10, 1979), known professionally as Kangta (stylized sometimes in all caps and formerly as KangTa), is a South Korean singer, composer, songwriter, record producer, actor and radio personality. He is well known as a member of boy band H.O.T.

Career

1996–2001: H.O.T. 

Kangta was discovered at Lotte World, a theme park, when he was only 13 years old. He made his debut on-screen appearance as a backup dancer together with future bandmate Moon Hee-joon for labelmate singer Yoo Young-jin. Kangta eventually decided to become a singer with Moon and three others, Jang Woo-hyuk, Tony An, and Lee Jae-won to form H.O.T. in 1996. 
The group disbanded in 2001, after the group contract expired as the members decided not to renew it.

2001–2003: Solo debut 
Soon after H.O.T. disbanded in March 2001, Kangta made his solo debut after renewing his contract with S.M. Entertainment. He released his first solo album "Polaris", which became a huge hit; it was followed by his second album Pinetree in 2002. His first solo concert took place on August 23–24, 2002.

2004–2008: Acting roles and military service
Kangta received several offers and has accepted a drama offer in China. In 2004, he starred in a drama called Magic Touch of Fate together with Taiwanese actors and actresses, Ruby Lin and Alec Su. Kangta portrayed the role of the evil magician Jin-Xiu

Soon afterwards, Kangta returned to Korea and released his third album, Persona, in 2005, which included tracks that were very different from his previous two albums. Kangta surprised his fans when he said he wanted to become an actor. A month later, he starred in a KBS drama, Loveholic.

In 2005, Kangta was chosen as the best Korean singer overseas, according to Arirang International Broadcasting. A poll was issued over the internet, allowing only people outside of Korea to vote.2005 Mnet KM Music Video Festival

Kangta also acted in his second Chinese drama, Love in the City 2. In the series, Kangta portrayed the life of a successful CEO with a dull life. In March Kangta was announced to be playing a supporting role in JTBC's 2012 drama Happy Ending as Kim So-eun's love interest.

In 2007, he filmed two dramas and Love in the City 2 aired on October 1, 2007. In January 2007, Kangta took part in the Hallyu Festival in Osaka, which also featured Jun Jin and Lee Min-woo of Shinhwa, SG Wannabe and actor Song Seung-heon at the Osaka Dome.

Kangta enlisted for mandatory military service in April 2008 for 21 months of active duty. During which time he starred in military musical Mine with rapper Yang Dong-geun. It is about the true life story of Lieutenant Lee Jong-myung, who lost his legs in a land mine explosion near the demilitarized zone, in June 2000, when he saved fellow soldier, Sul Dong-seob from the minefield.

2010: Chinese debut 
After two years and five months of hiatus from the entertainment industry due to Korean military service, Kangta released his first Chinese extended play, Breaka Shaka. The lead single was released on September 13 and the EP was released on September 14. The EP marked Kangta's entrance to the Chinese market.

2016: 'Home' Chapter 1
In March 2014, Kangta, alongside labelmate BoA, was appointed as a de facto creative director of S.M. Entertainment.

In October 2016, S.M. Entertainment announced that Kangta would hold a concert to celebrate his 20th debut anniversary titled Coming Home, as a part of SM Entertainment's concert series The Agit. The concert was held from November 4 to November 6 at SMTown Theatre. On October 11, S.M. Entertainment confirmed that Kangta currently preparing his new album. On the same day, it was confirmed that Kangta would appear on JTBC's A Hyung I Know and would be aired on October 29. Kangta released his first Korean extended play 'Home' Chapter 1 on November 3. The album contains five tracks, with the lead single titled "Diner".

2019–present: "Love Song", 25th anniversary and Eyes on You 
In 2019, it was revealed Kangta would be coming back with a single called "Love Song" on August 4, featuring Paloalto. However, the single's release was cancelled in light of cheating allegations that surfaced against him.

SM Entertainment announced that Kangta would begin preparations for his twenty-fifth anniversary project throughout 2021. He first released the single "Freezing" on March 24.  Kangta released the remake single "Free To Fly 2021" on July 14.  The second single for the project "Christmas in July" was released on July 28.  The third single "Maybe" was released on October 12.  The fourth single "Slow Dance" was released on January 12, 2022.

On August 17, 2022, it was announced that Kangta would be making a comeback on September 7 with his fourth studio album Eyes on You, marking his first almost two decades (since 2005). The lead single of the same name was released on the same day the ten-track album was released, and "Love Song" was released as a track from the album after being shelved for three years.

Personal life
He is an experienced songwriter and composer, having written over 100 songs for H.O.T.'s albums as well as for other groups and singers like NRG and former labelmate Fly to the Sky.

On February 4, 2020, it was confirmed that Kangta is in a relationship with actress Jung Yumi.

Group projects

S (Supreme) 

After planning for years, Kangta worked with his celebrity friends Shin Hye-sung from Shinhwa and Lee Ji-hoon to form the project group named 'S', an initialism for 'Supreme'. They released their first solo project album called Fr. In. Cl. (short for 'Friends in Classic'; 2003). They have won several awards since then. Their title track, "I Swear" was written, composed, and arranged by Kangta while Shin wrote the English lyrics.

On 14 October 2014, it was announced that group 'S' would be making a comeback after over a decade with a new mini-album titled Autumn Breeze, scheduled to be released on October 27. SM Entertainment stated that "Kangta wrote and produced all the songs on the upcoming album. Kangta’s unique music style and the trio’s harmonious voices will create beautiful ballads that will satisfy the fans". On October 18, the group performed their new song "Without You" at SM Entertainment's agency-wide concert SM Town in Shanghai. The music video for the song was released on October 24, starring Yuri of Girls' Generation. The group was slated to be on Immortal Songs 2 on November 3 as part of their promotions.

Kangta & Vanness 

Early 2006, Kangta collaborated with Vanness Wu of F4 from Taiwan, and formed Kangta & Vanness. Their debut was in Thailand ending the ceremony for the 2006 MTV Asia Awards. They released their single "Scandal" and have been busy promoting their single all over Asia. "Scandal" was a success over Asia and a repackaged version was released in mid-July. On September 12, they held a showcase in Malaysia, Berjaya Times Square.

On Arirang TV's talk show Heart to Heart, Kangta announced that he would be entering the Army in early 2008, during which activities were put on hold.

Discography

Studio albums

Compilation albums

Live albums

Extended plays

Singles

As lead artist

As featured artist

Soundtrack appearances

Music videos

Production credits
That Winter, the Wind Blows OST (2013)
Autumn Breeze by S (2014)
Rewind by Zhoumi (2014)

Songwriting and composing credits

Tours and concerts 
 Kangta 1st Concert: Pinetree (2002)
 The Agit: Coming Home (2016)

Filmography

Film

Television dramas

TV show

Radio

Awards and nominations

Notes

References

External links 
  SM Entertainment's Official Site
  H.O.T.'s Official Site

 
1979 births
Living people
SM Town
H.O.T. (band) members
South Korean mandopop singers
Mandarin-language singers of South Korea
People from Yecheon County
South Korean rhythm and blues singers
South Korean record producers
South Korean male singer-songwriters
South Korean male television actors
South Korean male film actors
South Korean male pop singers
South Korean male idols
South Korean radio presenters
South Korean television personalities
Dongguk University alumni
Male actors from Seoul
Singers from Seoul
SM Entertainment artists
MAMA Award winners
20th-century South Korean male singers
21st-century South Korean male singers
21st-century South Korean male actors